is a Japanese actor. He is not to be confused with Japanese stunt actor Jun Murakami.

Career
Murakami starred in Sho Miyake's Playback (2012). He co-starred in Sion Sono's The Land of Hope (2012) with Megumi Kagurazaka.

He has also appeared in films such as Takahisa Zeze's Heaven's Story and Gakuryu Ishii's Isn't Anyone Alive?.

Filmography

Film
 Bounce Ko Gals (1997)
 Nabbie's Love (1999)
 Shiki-Jitsu (2000)
 New Battles Without Honor and Humanity (2000)
 Stereo Future (2001)
 Konsento (2001)
 Blue (2001)
 Red Shadow (2001)
 Konsento (2001)
 Border Line (2002)
 Filament (2002)
 Desert Moon (2003)
 Out of This World (2004)
 Cutie Honey (2004)
 69 (2004)
 Into a Dream (2005)
 Nanayo (2008)
 Michiko & Hatchin (2008)
 Sweet Rain: Accuracy of Death (2008)
 Counterfeit Bills (2009)
 Zen (2009)
 Nonchan Noriben (2009)
 The Lightning Tree (2010)
 Heaven's Story (2010)
 Sketches of Kaitan City (2010)
 Sword of Desperation (2010)
 The Egoists (2011)
 Yakuza Weapon (2011)
 Dog Police (2011)
 The Depths (2011)
 Isn't Anyone Alive? (2012)
 Himizu (2012)
 Our Homeland (2012)
 A Road Stained Crimson (2012)
 Bakugyaku Familia (2012)
 Playback (2012)
 The Land of Hope (2012)
 A Woman and War (2013)
 Crying 100 Times: Every Raindrop Falls (2013)
 Still the Water (2014)
 Kabukicho Love Hotel (2014)
 Sun (2016)
 Shinjuku Swan II (2017)
 Policeman and Me (2017)
 Moon and Lightning (2017)
 Dynamite Graffiti (2018)
 My Friend "A" (2018)
 It's Boring Here, Pick Me Up (2018)
 21st Century Girl (2019)
 Aircraft Carrier Ibuki (2019)
 According to Our Butler (2019)
 We Are Little Zombies (2019), Rintaro Takemura
 First Love (2019), Ichikawa
 They Say Nothing Stays the Same (2019)
 Silent Rain (2019)
 Nōten Paradise (2020)
 Mio's Cookbook (2020)
 A Girl on the Shore (2021)
 Every Trick in the Book (2021), Yamashita
 Owari ga Hajimari (2021)
 Shimamori no Tō (2022), Taizō Arai
 Pure Japanese (2022)
 Tombi: Father and Son (2022), Murata
 You've Got a Friend (2022), Yoshio Yoshida
 Silent Parade (2022)
 Hell Dogs (2022)
 2 Women (2022)

Television
 Yae's Sakura (2013), Hijikata Toshizō
 Silver and Gold (2017), Masashi Funada
 Bullets, Bones and Blocked Noses (2021)

References

External links
 
 

1973 births
Living people
Japanese male film actors
Japanese male television actors
Male actors from Osaka Prefecture
20th-century Japanese male actors
21st-century Japanese male actors